The Huning Highlands Historic District is a historic district in Albuquerque, New Mexico which encompasses the entirety of the Huning Highlands neighborhood. The neighborhood was Albuquerque's first residential subdivision and was mostly developed between the 1880s and 1920s. It is known for its high concentration of Victorian and early 20th-century houses. The district was added to the New Mexico State Register of Cultural Properties in 1976 and the National Register of Historic Places in 1978.

History

The Atchison, Topeka, and Santa Fe Railway reached Albuquerque in 1880, fueling land speculation as investors hoped to profit from its arrival. The  parcel they assembled quickly developed into the booming community of New Town—today's Downtown. Huning also owned land in the rolling sandhills further to the east, which was known as the Highlands due to its elevation. In 1880, the land was platted as the first subdivision to be added to the original townsite. This new neighborhood was named Huning's Highland Addition, which later shifted to Huning Highlands.

The neighborhood was laid out by civil engineer Walter G. Marmon, who named the main north-south streets Arno, after Franz Huning's son, Walter and Edith after his own son and daughter, and Broadway, because "every town should have a Broadway". The uppermost street of the gently sloping neighborhood was named High Street. The Highlands quickly became one of Albuquerque's most popular residential areas and was home to many of the city's prominent early residents. Unlike the old Hispanic neighborhoods like Old Town, Barelas, and Atrisco, Huning Highlands was primarily built by recently arrived Anglo-Americans and European immigrants. As such, the houses in the neighborhood reflected styles and materials popular in the eastern and Midwestern United States—Queen Anne, Italianate, and other Victorian styles—rather than traditional regional forms. Most of the houses were built using prefabricated trim and architectural elements in a mix-and-match approach not adhering to any particular style, though some are more cohesive.

The neighborhood continued to fill in between the 1880s and 1920s, by which time it was almost completely built up. Residents enjoyed amenities like Highland Park, one of the city's oldest public parks, the Old Main Library, and an electric streetcar line which went into service in 1911. However, as the city continued to grow, many wealthy residents abandoned the older inner-city neighborhoods in favor of the more suburban developments further to the east. By the 1970s, Huning Highlands had become a relatively poor neighborhood consisting largely of absentee-owned rental housing. 

The Huning Highlands Historic District was added to the National Register of Historic Places in 1978 and in 1980, the Albuquerque City Council approved the city's first Historic Overlay Zone for the neighborhood. The city designation requires approval from the Landmarks and Urban Conservation Commission for any alterations to contributing properties in the district and provides tax incentives for home restoration projects. These actions had a positive effect on the neighborhood and led to many of the historic houses being restored. According to the Huning Highlands Historic District Association, the percentage of properties that were considered "blighted or substandard" decreased from 52% in 1976 to 17% in 1986 and was estimated at less than 5% by 2005.

Notable buildings

References

External links

Historic districts in New Mexico
New Mexico State Register of Cultural Properties
National Register of Historic Places in Albuquerque, New Mexico